Raml Zayta (Raml Zeitâ), also Khirbet Qazaza, was a Palestinian Arab village located 15 km northwest of Tulkarm.

History

British Mandate era
In  the 1931 census of Palestine it was counted with Zeita, Tulkarm, and together they had a population 1165,  all Muslim, in a total of  237 houses.

In the 1945 statistics, the village had a population of 140 Muslims, with a total of 14,837 dunams of land.  The land ownership of the village before occupation in dunams:

Types of land use in dunams in the village in 1945:

1948, and aftermath
According to Rosemarie Esber, the village was depopulated on 15 March 1948 during the 1948 Palestine war. Benny Morris lists it as one of the villages for which the causes and date of depopulation are unknown.

Esber, in an interview with a refugee from Raml Zaita, Zakiya Abu Hammad, writes that according to his memories, Yishuv forces had besieged the village for about two weeks, causing a lack of food: "[The Jews] started going into people's homes and forcing them out. They told us, "You either leave or we'll kill you." Some people were killed on the roads, as they abandoned their homes... They followed us. Those who were lucky, escaped with their lives, others did not." The villages were then forced out of their town and the surrounding villagers.

According to Walid Khalidi  writing in 1992, an Arab family is still living in the village in one of the original houses.

References

Bibliography

External links
Welcome To Raml Zayta, Palestine Remembered
Raml Zayta, Zochrot
Survey of Western Palestine, Map 8:     IAA, Wikimedia commons

Arab villages depopulated during the 1948 Arab–Israeli War
District of Tulkarm